True Power is the third studio album by American rock band I Prevail, released on August 19, 2022. The album was proceeded by the singles "Body Bag" and "Bad Things". "Self-Destruction", "There's Fear in Letting Go" and "Deep End" also later became singles.

Background and recording
The album was produced by Tyler Smyth, who also produced the band's previous album, Trauma. In an interview with Wall of Sound, guitarist Steve Menoian discussed the process of making the album:

Composition
True Power has been described as metalcore, post-hardcore, hard rock, rap metal, and nu metal, with elements of pop, trap, electronic, and grunge. Vocalists Brian Burkheiser and Eric Vanlerberghe both incorporate rap vocals on the album.

Release
On June 17, 2022, the band released the lead single "Body Bag". On July 12, 2022, the band released the second single "Bad Things". On August 19, 2022, the band released a music video for the song "Self-Destruction". The album was released on August 19, 2022.

Critical reception

True Power has received generally positive reviews from music critics. Paul Travers of Kerrang! complimented the album's dynamics and production stating, "I Prevail have expanded on the lighter moments from Trauma. But there’s always an explosion waiting to drop, and producing those jaw-dropping moments is one of the things they do so well." Chanel Issa of Hysteria Mag felt that "[the album] breathed new life into I Prevail’s sound, placing them in high contention for the coveted title of kings of the metalcore sandpit. 

Melinda Welsh of Spill Magazine praised unclean vocalist Eric Vanlerberghe for "[stepping out of his comfort zone...to deliver some softer-spoken rap style lyrics and clean vocals..." and called True Power "their most aggressive album yet." In a less positive review of the album, Jesper L. of friendly Sputnikmusic considered the album to be a "reminder that overblown production can’t hide lazy songwriting." Wall of Sound sated "I Prevail take everything they did on Trauma and dial it up to 11." On November 2nd 2022, their single 'Bad Things' have peaked number 1 on the Billboard Active Rock Radio Charts, the first time since 2020 with their hit single, Hurricane.

Track listing

Personnel 

I Prevail
 Brian Burkheiser – vocals
 Eric Vanlerberghe – vocals
 Steve Menoian – lead guitar, bass
 Dylan Bowman – rhythm guitar, backing vocals 
 Gabe Helguera – drums

Production
 Tyler Smyth – production mixing, engineering
 Ted Jensen – mastering

Charts

Singles

References

2022 albums
I Prevail albums
Fearless Records albums